Petroshimi Tabriz Futsal Club was an Iranian futsal club based in Tabriz. In 2010 Petroshimi Tabriz was terminate their Futsal activities. Dabiri Tabriz took over their license.

Season-by-season 
The table below chronicles the achievements of the Club in various competitions.

Managers 
  Shahabeddin Sofalmanesh
  Ali Khosravi

See also 
 Petrochimi Tabriz F.C.
 Petrochimi Tabriz Cycling Team

References 

Futsal clubs in Iran
Sport in Tabriz
Defunct futsal clubs in Iran
2010 disestablishments in Iran
Association football clubs disestablished in 2010